Hedley Brian Taber (born 29 April 1940) is an Australian former cricketer  who played in 16 Test matches as a wicket-keeper from 1966 to 1970. He represented New South Wales in domestic cricket.

Taber played 129 first-class matches with a career batting average of 18.01, a highest test score of 48, and a highest first-class score of 109. He retired from first-class cricket in 1974.

References

1940 births
Living people
Australia Test cricketers
New South Wales cricketers
Sportspeople from Wagga Wagga
Australian cricketers
Wicket-keepers